Malicious is a 1995 Canadian-American erotic thriller film starring Molly Ringwald and Patrick McGaw. The plot follows a star college baseball player (McGaw) who has a fling with a disturbed medical student (Ringwald) who begins to stalk him.

The film's main character has been discussed by psychiatrists and film experts, and has been used as a film illustration for the psychiatric entity known as borderline personality disorder.

References

External links

1995 films
1990s psychological thriller films
1990s erotic thriller films
American erotic thriller films
Canadian erotic thriller films
English-language Canadian films
Erotic romance films
Borderline personality disorder in fiction
Films about sexuality
Films about stalking
1990s English-language films
1990s American films
1990s Canadian films